Fortune Barishal is a franchise cricket team plays in the Bangladesh Premier League (BPL), representing the country's Barishal Division. Following the 2015 competition, the team were one of the BPL's six existing members and participated in the league's 2016 edition.

The team was originally established in 2012 for the inaugural BPL season as the Barisal Burners (often abbreviated as BB). The Burners were the BPL runners-up in 2012. The Burners were one of the teams dissolved in 2013 after the BPL's second edition.

The franchise was sold to the Axiom Technologies and rebranded as the Bulls for the 2015 edition. Axiom Technologies' chairman was banned for life from cricket and thus Awwal Bhulu was sworn in. The Bulls were coached by Graham Ford and captained by Mahmudullah Riyad in 2015/16 Bangladesh Premier League. Sri Lanka born Australian Dav Whatmore and Bangladesh's current test captain Mushfiqur Rahim   were the head coach and captain for Season 4 (2016/17 Bangladesh Premier League) respectively.

The team were excluded from BPL 5 due to financial difficulties. The team returned in 2021–22 Bangladesh Premier League under new ownership.

History
In 2012, the Bangladesh Cricket Board (BCB) created the Bangladesh Premier League cricket tournament to be played under Twenty20 rules. For the inaugural tournament held in February of the same year, a list of six teams to participate in the tournament was finalised. The teams representing the divisions of Bangladesh, including Barisal, were put up for auction at the Radisson Hotel in Dhaka on 10 January 2012. Barisal Burners were bought by ALIF SSL Sports Holdings Ltd (a concern of the ALIF Group) for a price of US$1.01 million, which was the lowest price paid at the auction.

Seasons

2012 season

The biggest buy by the Burners was for West Indies opener Chris Gayle, who was bought for a grand total of $551,000, the second biggest buy of the inaugural BPL, however he was only available for five games. In his short stay he was able to score two centuries and had the highest average of 97.00. The Burners continued with Pakistani opener Ahmed Shehzad and the experienced Australian Brad Hodge opening the batting. Other players in the team included Shahriar Nafees, who was the "icon player", and Mominul Haque, Al Amin, Suhrawadi Shuvo, English wicketkeeper Phil Mustard and Pakistan's Yasir Arafat. The team also included Australian fast bowler Shane Harwood until he was injured. The Burners had a stable batting line-up which was crucial in enabling them to qualify for the semi-finals, especially in a close run chase against Chittagong Kings in the penultimate league match. The Burners defeated the table toppers Duronto Rajshahi in the semi-final but lost the final against Dhaka Gladiators by 8 wickets.

2013 season

Barisal had a poor campaign in the 2013 edition of the tournament. They finished in the bottom 3 and thus did not qualify for the playoffs. They finished 6th out of the 7 teams competing to earn a place in the playoffs. Barisal could not retain Chris Gayle as he signed to play for the Dhaka Gladiators. They managed to include Sunil Narine in their squad and retained Phil Mustard and Brad Hodge. They could not keep a consistent win streak which led to their downfall in the 2nd edition of the tournament.

2015 season

At the 2015 season of BPL, Barisal Burners was rebranded as Barisal Bulls after the change of owner. The biggest buy that season for them was Chris Gayle who played for Barisal Burners in the 2012 season and Dhaka Gladiators in the 2013 season. He was brought for an approximate $350,000. The other notable players of the team included Ex-Zimbabwean national team wicket-keeper Brendan Taylor, Evin Lewis and Kevon Cooper. The Pakistani players Mohammad Sami and Imad Wasim. Bangladeshi players included, all-rounder Mahmudullah Riyad, who was the icon player, Sabbir Rahman, Shahriar Nafees, Sohag Gazi, Al-Amin Hossain and Taijul Islam. The Bulls had a balanced squad with the class of Chris Gayle, Mahmudullah Riyad and Brendan Taylor on the top, and the pace and swing of Mohammad Sami and Al-Amin Hossain with the ball which led the team to qualify for the playoffs. They defeated Dhaka Dynamites by 18 runs in the Eliminator and Rangpur Riders by 5 wickets in the 2nd qualifier to reach the finals. They lost in a competitive final to Comilla Victorians by 3 wickets and ended up being the Runner-up of that tournament. Some of the notable records by the players of Barisal Bulls include Evin Lewis' 101*
Chis Gayle's 92 and Kevon Cooper being named the highest wicket taker of the tournament with 22 wickets.

2016 season

The team signed Mushfiqur Rahim as their icon player and captain while the team couldn't sign big names like last season. They signed Dawid Malan, Rumman Raees, Thisara Perera and more from the overseas department while they retained Taijul Islam and Al-Amin Hossain from the local category. They also signed Shahriar Nafees, Abu Hider and more from the draft.

They started off on a sour note as they lost to Dhaka Dynamites but won against Comilla Victorians and Rajshahi Kings (defending first innings total of 192) later on. In the end, finished last in the league stage due to bowling department failure though their icon player put up a great show with the bat as he was one of the highest run getters of the season.

Squads

References

Sport in Barisal
Cricket clubs established in 2015
Sports clubs in Bangladesh
Bangladesh Premier League teams
Cricket in Barisal
2015 establishments in Bangladesh